Kunić is a settlement in the municipality of Plaški, in the Lika region of Croatia. It is located 6.5 km northwest of the municipal seat at Plaški.

Prior to the administrative reorganization of SR Croatia, it was part of the municipality of Ogulin. During the Croatian War of Independence, the village was occupied by Serbs. The village is ecclesiastically part of the Serbian Orthodox Eparchy of upper Karlovac. The village has a Serb majority.

References

Populated places in Karlovac County